Alex is a unisex given name.

Alex may also refer to:

People with the given name
Alex (actor) (1959–2011), Indian actor and magician
Alex (footballer, born 1975), Brazilian footballer
Alex (footballer, born 1976), Brazilian footballer
Alex (footballer, born 1977), Brazilian footballer
Alex (footballer, born 1979), Portuguese footballer
Alex (footballer, born January 1982), Brazilian-Armenian footballer
Alex (footballer, born February 1982), Brazilian footballer
Alex (footballer, born March 1982), Brazilian footballer
Alex (footballer, born June 1982), Brazilian footballer
Alex (footballer, born 1983), Brazilian footballer
Alex (footballer, born February 1988), Wesley Alex Maiolino, Brazilian football forward
Alex (footballer, born December 1988), Alexandre Monteiro de Lima, Brazilian football midfielder
Alex (footballer, born 1989), Brazilian footballer
Alex (footballer, born 19 May 1990), Francisco Alex do Nascimento Moraes, Brazilian football striker
Alex (footballer, born 20 May 1990), Alex dos Santos Gonçalves, Brazilian football forward
Alex (footballer, born August 1990), Brazilian footballer
Alex (footballer, born 1999), Brazilian footballer
Alex (footballer, born 2001), Brazilian footballer
Alessandro Santos (born 1977), Japanese footballer, better known as "Alex"

People with the surname
Elizabeth Alex, American television news anchor
Francisco Alex (born 1983), Brazilian footballer
Jacqueline Alex (born 1965), German swimmer

Places
Alex, Haute-Savoie, France
Alex, Oklahoma, US
Alex (restaurant), Las Vegas, US
 Alexanderplatz, Berlin, Germany

Film and TV
Alex (film), a 1992 New Zealand/Australia film
"Alex" (Supergirl episode), an episode of American TV Series Supergirl
AleX, an Italian TV series
Alex, Inc., an American sitcom

Other uses
Alex (automobile), an early British automobile
Alex (comic strip), British newspaper comic strip 
Alex (moth), a genus of moth
Alex (parrot), talking African gray parrot studied by psychologist Irene Pepperberg
Alex (sniper rifle), a Polish sniper rifle (Bor)
Alex (software), a lexer generator written in Haskell
Alex (Verhœven series), a 2013 novel by Pierre Lemaitre
Alex (videotex service), by Bell Canada in the early 1990s
Alex eReader, an e-book reader
Joe Alex, pen name of Polish writer Krzysztof Soroczynski
 alex, a subsidiary of the German railway company Die Länderbahn
 Alex, a character in the video game Minecraft
Tropical Storm Alex (disambiguation), a number of named tropical cyclones
Storm Alex, a 2020 extratropical cyclone in Europe

See also
Alec, given name
Alek, given name
ALEKS, tutoring and assessment program